Scott Michie (born 22 August 1983) is a Scottish footballer, who last played in the SFL for Peterhead in the Scottish Second Division.

He is a striker, who started his career with Aberdeen before moving to Peterhead in 2004, with a year at Montrose followed by two years at Inverurie Loco Works, before returning to the Blue Toon in 2009, where he lasted four games before being released in 2010.

External links

1983 births
Living people
Footballers from Aberdeen
Scottish footballers
Scottish Premier League players
Scottish Football League players
Aberdeen F.C. players
Montrose F.C. players
Peterhead F.C. players
Inverurie Loco Works F.C. players
Association football forwards